The 2012 Louisiana Swashbucklers season was the eighth season as a professional indoor football franchise and their first in the Professional Indoor Football League (PIFL).

The team played their home games under head coach Darnell Lee at the Sudduth Coliseum in Lake Charles, Louisiana.

Schedule
Key:

Regular season
All start times are local to home team

Postseason

Roster

Division standings

External links
2012 results

Louisiana Swashbucklers
Louisiana Swashbucklers
Louisiana Swashbucklers